Mariam Patience Nalubega is a Ugandan politician. She is the Woman Member of Parliament, representing Butambala District in the Parliament of Uganda. She was elected to that position in March 2011. Prior to that, from 2005 until 2011, she served as the National Female Youth Member of Parliament in Uganda.

Background and education
She was born in Butambala District, Central Uganda, on 27 November 1981 to Saidi Lubega and Jalia Nakayange. She attended Makerere University Primary School, before she transferred to Butawuka Secondary School for her O-Level studies. She attended St. Francis Secondary School in Mengo, for her A-Level education. Nalubega holds the degree of Bachelor of Public Administration, obtained from [[St Lawrence University ], A Certificate of Public admistration and Management do ( Makerere university)]. She also holds the Diploma in Law, obtained from the Law Development Centre in Kampala.

Work experience
From 2001 until 2006, Mariam Nalubega was a member of Mpigi District Council, serving as the District Secretary for Health from 2003 until 2006. In 2006, she was elected as the National Female Youth Member of Parliament, serving in that position until 2011. During that period, she served on the parliamentary committee on the economy and on the Information and Communications Technology committee. In 2011, she was elected as the Woman District Member of Parliament, for the newly created Butambala District.

Other responsibilities
Mariam Nalubega is a single mother of four, she is a Rotarian, an entrepreneur a  currently pursuing a post graduate Diploma in Public admistration

See also
 Parliament of Uganda
 Mariam Najjemba
 Butambala District

References

External links
Website of the Parliament of Uganda
 Uganda: Wolokoso - Gen Otafiire Charms MP Nalubega, Loses Decorum

1981 births
Living people
Makerere University Business School alumni
Members of the Parliament of Uganda
Women members of the Parliament of Uganda
Law Development Centre alumni
People from Butambala District
Ganda people
Ugandan Muslims
21st-century Ugandan women politicians
21st-century Ugandan politicians